Vysoká nad Uhom is a village and municipality in Michalovce District in the Kosice Region of eastern Slovakia.

History
In historical records the village was first mentioned in 1214.

Geography
The village lies at an altitude of 109 metres and covers an area of  (2020-06-30/-07-01).

Population 
The municipality has a population of 794 people (2020-12-31).

Culture
The village has a football pitch. The village contains a shrine dedicated to Anna Kolesárová, which is a destination for Roman Catholic pilgrims.

References

External links
https://web.archive.org/web/20070513023228/http://www.statistics.sk/mosmis/eng/run.html

Villages and municipalities in Michalovce District